Montale may refer to:

Eugenio Montale (1896–1981), Italian poet
Montale (San Marino), one of the Three Towers of San Marino
Montale, Tuscany, municipality in the Province of Pistoia in the Italian region Tuscany
Montale Rangone, village in Castelnuovo Rangone
22379 Montale, minor planet

See also 
 Mondale (disambiguation)